Dui Diner Duniya, is a 2022 Bangladeshi Bengali film. This flim is directed by Anam Biswas the director of Debi and written by Ashraful Alam Shaon.

Plot

Cast 

 Chanchal Chowdhury as Samad
 Fazlur Rahman Babu as Jamshed
 Tania Brishty as Beauty
 Moushumi Hamid as Lota

References

External links 
 

2022 films
Bengali-language Bangladeshi films